Whetham is a surname. Notable people with the surname include:
Adelaide Boddam-Whetham (1860–1954), British archer
John Boddam-Whetham (1843–1918), English naturalist and cricketer
Arthur Whetham (died 1853), British Army officer
Charles Whetham (1812–1885), British politician and businessman
David Whetham, British academic
John Whetham (died 1796), Irish religious figure
Nathaniel Whetham (1604–1668), English baker and politician
Thomas Whetham (died 1741), British soldier and politician
William Cecil Dampier Whetham (1867–1952), British agriculturalist and science historian
Margaret Anderson (indexer) (born Margaret Dampier Whetham, 1900–1997), British biochemist, daughter of William Cecil Dampier Whetham
Edith Holt Whetham (1911–2001), English agricultural economist, daughter of William Cecil Dampier Whetham

See also 

 Whetham, Wiltshire